Michael Durrell (born Sylvester Joseph Ciraulo; October 6, 1939 in Brooklyn, New York) is an American actor.

He began his career in the role of attorney Peter Wexler on the CBS soap opera The Guiding Light. In 1969, he appeared on Broadway in Cock-A-Doodle-Dandy at the Lyceum Theatre. Other television roles were as police Lieutenant Moraga in the short-lived CBS crime drama Shannon (1981–1982), starring Kevin Dobson in the title role, and then as Nicholas Stone from 1984-1985 on CBS's Alice. Another well-known role was in 1983 in the NBC science fiction miniseries called V and the 1984 sequel V: The Final Battle as Robert Maxwell and reprised his role in the first two episodes of V: The Series. He played D.A. Lloyd Burgess on the hit TV series Matlock from 1986 to 1990, and as Dr. John Martin, the father of Donna Martin on the hit Fox TV series Beverly Hills, 90210, in which he had a recurring role. He guest starred in the Star Trek: Deep Space Nine episode "Sanctuary". He appears in Season 1, Episode 5 of The Eddie Capra Mysteries and Season 5, Episode 10 of Dexter.

Film

Television

References

External links
 

1943 births
20th-century American male actors
21st-century American male actors
American male film actors
American male television actors
Living people
Male actors from New York City
People from Brooklyn